Jezeh or Jazeh or Jezzeh may refer to:
 Jezzeh, Fars
 Jezeh, Isfahan
 Jazeh, Kashan, Isfahan Province